1&1 AG (known until June 2, 2021, as: 1&1 Drillisch Aktiengesellschaft) is a German telecommunications service provider headquartered in Maintal and listed on the TecDAX. Since 2017, the majority of the company has belonged to United Internet, and offers both mobile and landline services.

Infrastructure 
For its mobile services, the company relies on the network infrastructures of Telefónica Germany (all brands) as well as that of Vodafone Germany (1&1 brand). Due to the requirements of antitrust authorities regarding the merger between E-Plus and Telefónica, Drillisch was able to secure 30% of Telefónica's network capacity. Historically, the company relies on the networks of other providers as well as its own 1&1 Versatel network for its DSL (Digital Subscriber Line) and fiber-optics services. With 1&1 Versatel, its parent company, United Internet, owns its own landline infrastructure operates more and more customer connections with its own broadband supply.

In the sale by auction of 5G frequencies in 2019, the company received the bid for the construction of its own mobile network. Drillisch acquired with 50 MHz of spectrum in the 3500 MHz band and 2x10 MHz in the 2100 MHz FDD band. Its network is slated to begin operation at the start of 2021. A basic requirement to begin work as a network operator is national roaming, for which 1&1 received an improved offer from Telefónica in October 2020 following assessment by the European Commission. At the end of May 2021, the offer was converted into a contract.

Group divisions 
The core business of mobile services is domiciled in the fully affiliated subsidiaries:

  GmbH
1&1 Telecom GmbH
 Drillisch Online GmbH, including:
DeutschlandSIM
Discotel
Eteleon
handyvertrag.de
M2M-Mobil
Maxxim
n-tv go!
PremiumSIM
sim.de
simplytel
smartmobil.de
Telco
WinSIM
yourfone
 Drillisch Logistik GmbH (acquired on May 5, 2015, as The Phone House Telecom GmbH from Dixons Carphone plc)
 IQ-optimize Software AG (for the performance of primarily company-owned IT services for the mobile-services business)

Under the brand names of the Drillisch subsidiaries, primarily mobile-services providers for private customers are marketed via the internet, and M2M products are marketed to businesses. For (a selection of) these products, the mobile networks of both Telefónica and Vodafone are utilized, whereby the products in the Vodafone network generally display a higher average price level than those of Telefónica. Private consumers comprise about 20% of the total business, and business guidelines for the subsidiaries mostly come from the company's central headquarters, meaning that most brands display a similarly structured tariff portfolio. As of April 1, 2014, all providers were introduced to a new tariff structure.

The Maintal subsidiary of Drillisch AG, IQ-optimize Software AG, operated under the name "IQ-work Software AG" until May 29, 2007, and primarily offers technical services for its parent company. To a lesser extent, the company offers similar services to other business clients. In addition to its technical services, IQ-optimize Software AG operates licenses for a "workflow management" software named "Mapito," which was developed in-house.

In September 2014, it became widely known that Drillisch was planning to either construct or acquire up to 600 storefronts from o2/E-Plus, in addition to its usage of 30% of the merger's network capacity. Since an interview on January 22, 2015, it became clear that these shops were slated to operate under the newly acquired brand name "Yourfone".

As of April 1, 2015, the operations of Eteleon AG and MS Mobile Services GmbH were transferred to Drillisch Telecom GmbH within the framework of an internal company restructure. Due to a merger agreement, Eteleon AG was merged into MSP Holding GmbH on March 17, 2015. Yourfone will comprise the storefront premium brand of the company, while Smartmobil will comprise the online premium brand.

On May 27, 2015, it became known that Drillisch would acquire about 300 storefronts from Telefónica Germany. On September 24, 2015, the subsidiary Drillisch Telecom GmbH took on a legal status of a corporation and began to operate as Drillisch Online AG. On December 28, 2017, Heiko Hambücker, Head of Sales and Marketing at Drillisch Online AG, informed the public that the shops would be sold to Aptus, of which René Schuster was the CEO. On July 18, 2018, Drillisch Online AG took on the legal status of a limited-liability company and began to operate as Drillisch Online GmbH. On October 23, 2020, the subsidiary Mobile Ventures GmbH was merged into Drillisch Online GmbH.

Ownership structure 
As of March 29, 2021, the ownership structure of 1&1 was comprised as follows:

History

Founding and first years 
In 1957, Fernseh-Hugo Forster OHG was founded, a company whose main activities included the installation of main antenna splitters as well as of communications and surveillance equipment. In 1983, Die Drillisch-Vetriebs-und Servicegesellschaft Nachrichten Technik mbH was founded in Maintal. In 1985, its product line was expanded to include mobile telephones from C-Netz.

In 1989, telefax devices were introduced into the market. From 1991 onward, digital alarm systems for firefighters were also introduced to the market, as well as equipment for fire and rescue control centers.

In 1992, Fernseh-Forster Hugo Forster OHG was converted into Forster Kommunikationselektronik GmbH. Two years later, Drillisch Vetriebs-Serviceges. Nachrichtentechnik mbH & Co. KG was founded and began its operations as a service provider of mobile services for the D2 network. In 1997, Drillisch AG was founded by Hans Jochen Drillisch, Marc Brucherseifer, and Nico Forster. As a formerly legally independent business, the Drillisch Group arose as a subsidiary of Drillisch AG. As a service provider, the company, which at the time owned none of its own network infrastructure, purchased telephone units from network operator Mannesmann Mobilfunk on a large scale, bundled them in special tariff packages, and sold them to private consumers. In their former core business, the sale of mobile telephones, fax devices, and other accessories, the company earned about 48% of its total revenue of 117.5 million marks.

Initial public offering 
The former Drillisch AG had its initial public offering in 1998. A total of up to 600,000 ordinary shares were issued with a nominal value of five marks each (including Greenshoe options of 40,000 shares), from which 360,000 stemmed from an increase in the capital stock to nine million marks and 240,000 shares stemmed from the portfolios of existing shareholders.

In 1998, the company received a landline license. One year later, their offers expanded to include internet-by-call access services.

In 2000, their landline license was sold to Elisa, a Finnish telecommunications firm, and 1&1 reoriented itself towards mobile internet services in order to avoid bankruptcy. The company established the search engine Acoona for web and WAP services. The further expansion of internet content could be observed with the acquisition of Open-Net Oy, a Finnish WAP-programming and content-creation firm.

In 2001, Drillisch became available for sale.

On February 16, 2004, the company UMTS began to market products for D2 Vodafone via subsidiaries Alphatel GmbH and Victorvox AG. On March 31, 2005, the then-board spokesman, Marc Brucherseifer, resigned from leadership of his own volition. Since 2006, board spokesman Paschalis Choulidis planned to united Talkline and Debitel under the name Mobilcom-Debitel, both for tax reasons and due to an increasing saturation of the mobile-phone market.

In January 2007, Drillisch acquired competitor Telco Services GmbH from Idstein im Taunus, which had over 300,000 customers (10% prepaid) for an estimated purchase price of 40 to 50 million euros. On December 19, 2008, it became publicly known that Drillisch AG was in the process of becoming a majority shareholder of eteleon e-solutions AG, a firm specializing in internet-based marketing. The purchase contract of 71.54% was put into effect in March 2009. Since August 16, 2009, eteleon e-solutions AG (100% b2c.de GmbH; discoTEL, DeutschlandSIM, eteleon) became a full subsidiary of Drillisch AG.

Attempted takeover by Freenet mobile-communications division and its shareholdings by United Internet 

On August 22, 2007, Drillisch announced that their share of 10.07% of competitor Freenet AG would increase to 28.56%. At the time, however, the purchase stood under review of antitrust authorities. In September 2007, Drillisch and United Internet presented to the public a collaborative plan for the acquisition of Freenet. With Holding MSP, Drillisch and United Internet controlled about 29% of Freenet AG. Holding MSP belonged to both companies equally.

In a quarterly report on October 31, 2007, Drillisch CEO Paschalis Choulidis first publicly expressed plans regarding the acquisition of Freenet's mobile-communications division (see Mobilcom). On November 20, 2007, United Internet announced that negotiations for the acquisition of Freenet had failed. By all accounts, Drillisch CEO Choulidis was surprised by this announcement and was only informed of such by a mandatory announcement released by United Internet.

At the end of November 2007, United Internet surprisingly purchased 5.15 million Drillisch shares, thus holding 9.68% of the company. On December 14, Drillisch and United Internet announced the further increase of MSP Holding GmbH's ownership of Freenet to 20.05%.

On December 20, 2007, Freenet also declared the end of negotiations regarding the acquisition of its mobile-communications division by Drillisch.

In October 2009, United Internet sold its shares of Drillisch AG.

In 2013, Drillisch reduced its share of Freenet from 20.8% to 0.39% in two steps, first in March 2013 and then in October 2013.

On April 27, 2015, United Internet announced its acquisition of a total 20.7% of shares of Drillisch AG, thereby becoming the company's majority shareholder. On May 26, 2015, United Internet's intentions were approved by federal antitrust authorities without any stipulations.

Dispute and settlement regarding commission payments with Deutsche Telekom AG 
In November 2011, Deutsche Telekom canceled its cooperation with Drillisch AG and its subsidiaries without prior notice, as Drillisch subsidiary Simply had been accused of commission fraud with prepaid mobile contracts. According to statements by Manfred Balz from Telekom, since February 2011, Drillisch AG had activated tens of thousands of mobile connections without having any actual customers for them.

Telekom also filed criminal charges against the company. After these events became widely known, the stock prices for Drillisch AG quickly sank up to 44%.

Drillisch decidedly disputed Telekom's accusations and explained that Simply fully complied with the provisions of its Telekom contracts.

On March 21, 2012, Drillisch announced the end of its legal dispute with Deutsche Telekom AG. Both companies entered into an agreement for the clearing and settlement of their contractual relationships and for the end of any pending civil proceedings. One month later, on April 19, 2012, the state attorney's office of Hanau, with approval of the appropriate court, permanently suspended legal action against Drillisch's board of directors and executive team.

Cooperation with Telefónica 
In 2014, when the merger between Telefónica and E-Plus was approved by the EU, albeit under certain conditions, Drillisch received the opportunity to lease 20% of Telefónica's mobile-network capacity. Drillisch's corporate subsidiary, MS Mobile Services GmbH (MS Mobile) entered into the contract in 2015 for a starting period of five years with the potential for extension up to 15 years total. This capacity was made available as Mobile Bitstream Access (MBA) in the form of data transfer and data volume. Until 2020, the used proportion of the total network capacity may be increased to 30%. This contract has made Drillisch the only MBA MVNO on the German mobile-services market.

In this context, Telefónica sold 102 of its own storefronts as well as 199 of its partner shops to the Drillisch Group.

Acquisition by United Internet 
As both companies announced on May 12, 2017, the majority of Drillisch shares would be acquired by United Internet by December 2017 as part of a reverse takeover. It was furthermore planned for United Internet to provide Drillisch AG with its own mobile-network and DSL divisions, namely 1&1 Telecommunication SE, by way of two real capital increases. As the former company boasted a much higher shareholder value, the transaction yielded majority shares of Drillisch for United Internet AG (at least 73.7%). The conglomerate was worth an estimated 3.7 million euros. With over 12 million mobile-services customers, Drillisch would become comparable to freenet AG, to date the fourth-largest service provider of the German market.

In January 2018, the company changed its name from Drillisch Aktiengesellschaft to 1&1 Drillisch Aktiengesellschaft.

On September 24, 2018, 1&1 Drillisch was additionally adopted into the TecDAX listing of MDAX, as part of a restructuring of stock indices.

Clearinghouse on internet copyright laws 
Since February 2021, 1&1 Drillisch has been a member of the Clearingstelle Urheberrechte im Internet (eng. approx. Clearinghouse on internet copyright laws).

Telecommunications business 
With 4.3 million DSL retail customers (as of 2018), the brand 1&1 is the third-largest provider of broadband connections in Germany, behind Deutsche Telekom and Vodafone. The DSL connections, which were on the market until June 2007, which required a Telekom landline connection to function, were implemented either by Telekom or by Telefónica Germany via Line-Sharing (excluding ADSL2+) and operated under the name 1&1 DSL. With the integration of VOIP (2004), Video-on-Demand (1&1 in cooperation with Maxdome), and the 1&1 mobile-services tariff (2007) in the DSL-based bundled offer, 1&1 became a Quadruple-Play provider.

In a DSL test carried out by the magazine Connect in July 2015, 1&1 ranked in first place, beating out Telekom, and marketed this fact in a comparative advertisement. Telekom countered with an ad of its own in the same magazine, which played on the poor mobile service of its competitors.

One special characteristic of the 1&1 business is its bundling, whereby hardware is offered in conjunction with a contract. As early as the 1990s, 1&1 achieved wide distribution with its own branded hardware, for example with the modem "1&1 Speedster 14.400". A milestone was reached in cooperation with Berlin manufacturer AVM, who pronounced 1&1 as their biggest client, and whose DSL routers were marketed under the "1&1" brand. Additional examples include, between 2006 and 2010, the mobile email device 1&1 PocketWeb, and, in 2010, the 1&1 SmartPad, which was originally designed as a remote control for the 1&1 MediaCenter, which was introduced in 2008.

External effects and marketing campaigns of the 1&1 brand 
Beginning in the Bundesliga soccer season 2021/21, Borussia Dortmund became an advertising partner of 1&1.

References

External links 

Companies based in Hesse
Companies established in 1983
Mobile phone companies of Germany
Companies in the TecDAX